HMS Relentless was an R-class destroyer of the Royal Navy that saw service during World War II. She was later converted into a Type 15 fast anti-submarine frigate, with the new pennant number F185.

History

Commissioned at Greenock on 30 November 1942, Relentless performed anti-submarine escort duties and patrolling activities in the South Atlantic and Indian Ocean for the balance of the war.

From 1946 until 1949 Relentless was held in reserve at Chatham and then Harwich.  From 1949 until 1951 she underwent conversion to a Type 15 Anti-Submarine Frigate. In 1951–1952 she was the leader of the 3rd Training Squadron. In 1953 she took part in the Fleet Review to celebrate the Coronation of Queen Elizabeth II.

In 1954 she was involved in a serious collision with the destroyer . From October 1956 until 1964 she was held in reserve at Gareloch, Chatham and Rosyth.

On 27 June 1964 she was re-commissioned to serve as part of the 29th Escort Squadron, to replace the destroyer .

Decommissioning and disposal
Relentless was placed on the disposal list in August 1965 and was sold to Thos. W. Ward for scrapping at Inverkeithing in 1971.

Commanding officers
The Commanding Officer from 1951 to 1952 was Captain Michael Le Fanu RN.

References

Publications
 
 
 
 
 Marriott, Leo, Royal Navy Destroyers Since 1945. Ian Allan, 1989. 
 
 
 
 

 

Q and R-class destroyers of the Royal Navy
Ships built on the River Tyne
1942 ships
World War II destroyers of the United Kingdom
Type 15 frigates